Sidónio da Silva Bastos Manhiça (born 16 April 1939) is a former Portuguese professional footballer.

Career statistics

Club

Notes

References

1939 births
Living people
Portuguese footballers
Association football defenders
Primeira Liga players
Segunda Divisão players
S.L. Benfica footballers
Atlético Clube de Portugal players
Varzim S.C. players
AD Fafe players